"Chosen" is a song by American rapper Blxst, featuring  American singer Ty Dolla Sign and fellow American rapper Tyga. It was released as a single from the deluxe version of Blxst's debut EP No Love Lost on December 4, 2020, through Red Bull Records and Evgle. In 2021, the song garnered attention due to Internet memes on TikTok, later gaining over 150 million views.

Background
The song contains a guitar sample from Electric Soul - Guitar Loops and Riffs by Treehouz.  Blxst told Billboard that working on the song was just "a normal day", explaining: "I was just working. It felt fun creating it. Something about it felt different. It gave a different energy as I was recording it. Then Ty Dolla Sign laid his verse, and it was all up from there."

Music video
An accompanying video was released on March 25, 2021. According to a press release from Red Bull Records, the inspiration behind the video was three college films: School Daze (1988), Love & Basketball (2000) and Stomp the Yard (2007). It shows the three artists holding a party at "Evgle University", "tailgating with cheerleaders at football games to partying at frat houses with the step team". As of August 2022, the video has over 65 million views.

Live performance
On November 4, 2021, Blxst and Ty Dolla Sign performed the song on The Tonight Show Starring Jimmy Fallon.

Credits and personnel
Credits adapted from Tidal
and WhoSampled.

 Blxst – producer, composer
 Tharealcstylez – producer
 Tharealjfkbeatz – producer
 Treehouz - producer
 Christopher Wilson – composer
 Jeremy Lawrence - composer
 Jared William Grace – composer
 Michael Ray – composer
 Tyrone Griffin – composer

Charts

Weekly charts

Year-end charts

Certifications

Release history

References

2020 songs
2021 singles
Ty Dolla Sign songs
Tyga songs
Songs written by Ty Dolla Sign
Red Bull Records singles
Songs written by Tyga